This is a list of heads of state of Portugal.

Monarchs

House of Burgundy (1139–1383)

The Portuguese House of Burgundy, known as the Afonsine Dynasty, was the founding house of the Kingdom of Portugal. Prior to the independence of Portugal, the house ruled the feudal County of Portugal, of the Kingdom of Galicia. When Alphonso I Henriques declared the independence of Portugal, he turned the family from a comital house to a royal house which would rule Portugal for over two centuries.
When Ferdinand I died, a succession crisis occurred and Ferdinand's daughter Beatrice of Portugal was proclaimed queen and her husband John I of Castile proclaimed king by the right of his wife. Her legitimacy as a monarch is disputed.

House of Aviz (1385–1580)
The House of Aviz, known as the Joanine Dynasty, succeeded the House of Burgundy as the reigning house of the Kingdom of Portugal. The house was founded by John I of Portugal, who was the Grand Master of the Order of Aviz. When King John II of Portugal died without an heir, the throne of Portugal passed to his cousin, Manuel, Duke of Beja. When King Sebastian of Portugal died, the throne passed to his uncle, Henry of Portugal (he might be called Henry II because  Henry, Count of Portugal, father of Alphonso I of Portugal, was the first of that name to rule Portugal).  When Henry died, a succession crisis occurred and António, Prior of Crato, was proclaimed António of Portugal.

House of Habsburg (1581–1640)
The House of Habsburg, known as the Philippine Dynasty, is the house that ruled Portugal from 1581 to 1640. The dynasty began with the acclamation of Philip II of Spain as Philip I of Portugal in 1580, officially recognized in 1581 by the Portuguese Cortes of Tomar. Philip I swore to rule Portugal as a kingdom separate from his Spanish domains, under the personal union known as the Iberian Union.

House of Braganza (1640–1910)
The House of Braganza, also known as the Brigantine Dynasty, came to power in 1640, when John II, Duke of Braganza, claimed to be the rightful heir of the defunct House of Aviz, as he was the great great grandson of King Manuel I. John was proclaimed King John IV, and he deposed the House of Habsburg in the Portuguese Restoration War.

The descendants of Queen Maria II and her consort, King Ferdinand II (a German prince of the House of Saxe-Coburg and Gotha), came to rule in 1853. Portuguese law and custom treated them as members of the House of Braganza, though they were still Saxe-Coburg and Gotha dynasts. This has led some to classify these last four monarchs of Portugal as members of a new royal family, called the House of Braganza-Saxe-Coburg and Gotha, though this view is not widely held.

Presidents
The complete list of presidents of the Portuguese Republic consists of the 20 heads of state in the history of Portugal since the  5 October 1910 revolution that installed a republican regime. This list includes not only those persons who were sworn into office as President of Portugal but also those who de facto served as head of state since 1910.

First Republic (1910–1926)

Second Republic (1926–1974)

Third Republic (1974–present) 

 Left office early:
  Assassinated.
  Died in office of natural causes.
  Resigned.
  Forced to resign due to a coup d'état.

See also

List of Portuguese royal consorts
List of titles and honours of the Portuguese Crown
Style of the Portuguese sovereign
President of Portugal
First Lady of Portugal
List of prime ministers of Portugal
Politics of Portugal
History of Portugal

Notes

References

External links
 History of titles of the kings of Portugal with bibliography

Portugal